Jemma Mi Mi (born 4 March 1996) is an Australian netball player in the Suncorp Super Netball league, playing for the Queensland Firebirds.

She attended Carmel College, Thornlands during her secondary schooling. Mi Mi made her debut for the Firebirds in 2017, signing with the Brisbane-based franchise in late 2016. As a young sportswoman, Mi Mi played high-level touch rugby and represented the Australian under-15 and Queensland under-21 netball teams, before being included as a reserve player for Australia at the Netball World Youth Cup. She has played 11 of 29 matches in her first two seasons at the Firebirds.

Recently completing a Bachelor of Clinical Exercise Physiology, off the court Mimi works with Body Smart Health as well as ambassador work with the Diamond Spirit Program.

References

External links
 Queensland Firebirds profile
 Suncorp Super Netball profile
 Netball Draft Central profile

1996 births
Australian netball players
Queensland Firebirds players
Living people
Suncorp Super Netball players
Netball players from New South Wales
Indigenous Australian netball players